Mall of Arabia may refer to:

Mall of Arabia (Jeddah), Jeddah, Saudi Arabia
Mall of Arabia (Dubai), Dubai, United Arab Emirates
Mall of Arabia (Giza), Giza, Egypt